The Biodiversity Conservation Act 2016 (BC Act) is a state-based act of parliament in New South Wales (NSW). Its long title is An Act relating to the conservation of biodiversity; and to repeal the Threatened Species Conservation Act 1995, the Nature Conservation Trust Act 2001 and the animal and plant provisions of the National Parks and Wildlife Act 1974. It supersedes the Threatened Species Conservation Act 1995, and commenced on 25 August 2017.

The purpose of the Act was to effect biodiversity reform  in New South Wales, in particular to provide better environmental outcomes and reduce burdensome regulations.  The Act lists many more purposes under the rubric of "ecologically sustainable development" than the former Act, and specifically mentions "biodiversity conservation in the context of a changing climate". 

 and since mid-2019, the BC Act is administered by the NSW Department of Planning, Industry and Environment.

Threatened Species Scientific Committee

Division 7 of Part 4 of the BC Act established the Threatened Species Scientific Committee, which can provide advice to declare species, populations, and ecological communities as endangered. Under the Biodiversity Conservation Act 2016, the Scientific Committee has declared various threatened species including the alpine she-oak skink (Cyclodomorphus praealtus) and the alpine tree frog (Litoria verreauxii alpina), while the Scientific Committee has determined "Eastern Suburbs Banksia Scrub" to be a critically endangered ecological community.

The main functions of the Threatened Species Scientific Committee include:

 assessing the risk of extinction of a species in Australia and deciding which species should be listed as critically endangered, endangered, vulnerable or extinct in NSW;
 for species that are not listed as threatened species, deciding if there are populations of those species that should be listed as threatened in NSW;
 assessing the risk of extinction of an ecological community in Australia and deciding which ecological communities should be listed as critically endangered, endangered, vulnerable or collapsed ecological communities;
 deciding which key threats to native plants and animals should be declared key threatening processes under the Biodiversity Conservation Act 2016 (BC Act); and
 reviewing and updating the lists of threatened species, populations and communities and key threatening processes in the schedules of the BC Act.

References

External links

New South Wales legislation
Nature conservation in Australia
Environmental law in Australia
Environment of Australian Capital Territory
2010s in Australia
2016 establishments in Australia
2016 in the environment